Making Waves: The Art of Cinematic Sound is a 2019 documentary film about the history of sound design in cinema of the United States. It is directed by Midge Costin.

Interviewees

 Walter Murch
 Ben Burtt
 Gary Rydstrom
 George Lucas
 Steven Spielberg
 Robert Redford
 Barbra Streisand
 Ryan Coogler
 Christopher Nolan
 Hans Zimmer
 David Lynch
 Ang Lee
 Sofia Coppola
 Peter Weir

Critical reception
The review aggregator website Rotten Tomatoes wrote of the critics' consensus, "Making Waves: The Art of Cinematic Sound pays an all-too-rare tribute to an aspect of filmmaking that's utterly fascinating but often overlooked." The similar website Metacritic surveyed  and assessed 11 reviews as positive and 1 as mixed. It gave a weighted average score of 80 out of 100, which it said indicated "generally favorable reviews".

References

External links

2019 films
2019 documentary films
American documentary films
Documentary films about the film industry
Documentary films about the cinema of the United States
2010s English-language films
2010s American films